20 - Venti (aka Twenty) is a 2000 Italian comedy-drama film directed by Marco Pozzi.

Plot 
The journey of a porn actress and a journalist, through twenty episodes, linked by the continued presence on the scene of cigarettes.

Cast 

Anita Caprioli: Beatriz, pornstar
Cecilia Dazzi: Eva, journalist
Ivano Marescotti: Angelo di II classe
Andrea Pezzi: Hit Boy
Alessandro Cremona: Robber / Transvestite / Singer
Sabrina Corabi: Angel 
Mike Bongiorno: Himself

References

External links

2000 films
Films about pornography
Italian road comedy-drama films
2000s road comedy-drama films
2000 directorial debut films
2000s Italian films